Chris Chester may refer to:

Chris Chester (American football) (born 1983), American football player
Chris Chester (rugby league) (born 1978), English rugby league footballer